Modrzewie may refer to the following places in Poland:
Modrzewie, Lower Silesian Voivodeship (south-west Poland)
Modrzewie, Kuyavian-Pomeranian Voivodeship (north-central Poland)
Modrzewie, Świętokrzyskie Voivodeship (south-central Poland)
Modrzewie, Masovian Voivodeship (east-central Poland)
Modrzewie, Greater Poland Voivodeship (west-central Poland)
Modrzewie, West Pomeranian Voivodeship (north-west Poland)